Kruszyniec  is a village in the administrative district of Gmina Góra, within Góra County, Lower Silesian Voivodeship, in south-western Poland. Prior to 1945 it was part of Germany and was named Juppendorf .

Main sights 
Wecke memorial – in remembrance of the forest warden Wecke who was murdered by a poacher on 21 December 1924.

References

Villages in Góra County